Bastian Henning (born 27 May 1983) is a German footballer who plays for FC Schönberg 95.

References

External links

 Bastian Henning Interview

1983 births
Living people
German footballers
Holstein Kiel players
VfB Lübeck players
Chemnitzer FC players
3. Liga players
Association football forwards
Sportspeople from Kiel